This is a list of roads designated N2. Roads entries are sorted in alphabetical order by country.

 N2 (Bangladesh), connects Dhaka and Tamabil via Sylhet
 N2 road (Belgium), connects Brussels and Maastricht
 National Road 2 (Democratic Republic of the Congo), connects Gisenyi and Kisangani
 N2 road (France), connects Paris and La Capelle
 N2 road (Gabon), connects Bifoun and Éboro in Cameroon
 N2 road (Ghana), connects Tema through Kpong, Yendi, and Bawku to Kulungugu
 N2 road (Ireland), connects Dublin and the border with Northern Ireland 
 N2 road (Luxembourg) 
 Route nationale 2 (Madagascar), connects Tananarive and Toamasina
 N2 road (Mauritania), connects Nouadhibou through Nouakchott to Rosso
 N2 road (Morocco), connects Tangier and Oujda
 N2 road (Netherlands), a section of the A2 motorway near Maastricht
 N2 highway (Philippines), a highway that connects Guiguinto in Bulacan and Laoag in Ilocos Norte, and comprises most of MacArthur Highway, or Manila North Road.
 N2 road (Republic of the Congo), connects Brazzaville and the northern border
 N2 road (Senegal), connects Kaolack and Kidira
 N2 road (South Africa), connects Cape Town, Port Elizabeth and Durban
 Carretera Nacional N-II (Spain), connects Madrid to Barcelona and France
 N2 road (Switzerland)
 N2 road (Zimbabwe), connects Harare-Borrowdale and Brooke

See also
 List of highways numbered 2